Fireman Save My Child is a 1918 American short comedy film starring Harold Lloyd.

Plot
Bebe's parents promise her hand in marriage to the local fire chief, Snub.  Bebe, however, is only interested in marrying Harold—who is not a member of the fire department. Harold crashes the Firemen's Ball where he gets into conflicts with Bebe's parents and Snub. Bebe leaves the ball angrily, declaring that her passion is for Harold. Shortly thereafter, the station receives an alarm about a fire. The second lieutenant abruptly quits the fire department. Harold agrees to take his place and drive the fire truck to the blaze. After stopping to extinguish a burning cigar in a drunk's pocket, the firemen arrive at the site of the real fire.  It is Bebe's house that is ablaze. Harold announces that he will enter the burning house to rescue Bebe from an upper floor if he can have her hand in marriage.  Her parents agree. After an initial mistake in which he rescues a household servant instead of Bebe, Harold succeeds. The film ends with Harold and Bebe shyly exchanging kisses.

Cast
 Harold Lloyd 
 Snub Pollard 
 Bebe Daniels 
 William Blaisdell
 Sammy Brooks
 Harry Burns
 Lige Conley (as Lige Cromley)
 Billy Fay (as B. Fay)
 Gus Leonard
 Alma Maxim
 James Parrott
 Dorothea Wolbert

See also
 List of American films of 1918
 Harold Lloyd filmography

References

External links

 Fireman Save My Child on YouTube

1918 films
1918 short films
1918 comedy films
Silent American comedy films
American silent short films
American black-and-white films
1910s English-language films
Films directed by Alfred J. Goulding
Films about firefighting
Films with screenplays by H. M. Walker
American comedy short films
1910s American films